The Christian Democratic Party of Albania (PKD) is a small Christian-democratic political party in Albania.

History
The party was established on 26 March 2013.
In the June 2013 parliamentary elections the PKD was part of the Alliance for a European Albania, led by the Socialist Party. It received 0.5% of the vote, winning a single seat in Parliament. In the 2017 elections the party's vote share fell to 0.2% and it lost parliamentary representation. During the 2021 election it joined the Democratic party and its alliance giving the party support.

References

Political parties in Albania
Political parties established in 2013
2013 establishments in Albania
Christian democratic parties in Europe
Conservative parties in Albania